Bruce M. Bryant (born July 12, 1951) is an American politician. He is a member of the South Carolina House of Representatives from the 48th District, serving since 2017. He is a member of the Republican party.

References

Living people
1951 births
Republican Party members of the South Carolina House of Representatives
21st-century American politicians